The Minister of Foreign Affairs is the head of the Ministry of Foreign Affairs and International Co-operation of the Government of Tanzania.

List of Ministers
The following have served the ministry:
 Parties

References